Cláudio Christóvam de Pinho (July 18, 1922 – May 1, 2000), better known as Cláudio, is the biggest scorer of all time for Corinthians. He has scored 306 goals in 554 games for the team, where he was nicknamed “Manager”. He was also known for being a skillful player, who placed the ball anywhere he wanted, and is usually ranked as the 3rd best ever Corinthians player, after Rivelino and Sócrates.

Biography 
Born in Santos (SP), Cláudio began his career with the youth squad of his hometown's most famous club Santos Futebol Clube. After a few games, he moved for a short time to Sociedade Esportiva Palmeiras.

The “Manager”, along with Baltazar, Luizinho, Mário, Carbone, Simão, Rafael, Robert and many other great players, helped Corinthians to win important championships, among them the São Paulo State Championship in 1951, 1952 and 1954 and the Rio-São Paulo Tournament in 1950, 1953 and 1954.

But it was not just with the Corinthians that Cláudio achieved glory. He was a member of the Palmeiras team that won the São Paulo state championship in 1942 and he was also part of the Brazil national team which won the South American Cup in 1949.

External links 
 

Brazilian footballers
1922 births
2000 deaths
Sportspeople from Santos, São Paulo
São Paulo FC players
Sport Club Corinthians Paulista players
Santos FC players
Sociedade Esportiva Palmeiras players
Brazilian football managers
Sport Club Corinthians Paulista managers
Association football midfielders